2U is the second album by singer-songwriter Keshia Chanté, released by BMG in Canada in December 2006 and Japan. The album is two-time Juno Award nominated.  Sony Urban/Epic Records released both "Summer Love" and "Been Gone" in the U.S. The video for the first single "Been Gone" was directed by Director X. Her second "2U" was shot in Miami in 2006. Her third single "Fallen" was released as two versions, featuring both Drake (musician) and Freeway (rapper).

SonyUrban/Epic asked for "Little Things" from her debut album to be included for the U.S. release.

Chanté helped co-write "Been Gone", "2U", "Ring The Alarm", "Sorry" and "Be About Yours" with the songwriters.

Chanté was nominated for the 2007 Juno Award for R&B/Soul Recording of the Year for the single "Been Gone", and the 2008 Juno Award for R&B/Soul Recording of the Year for the single "2U". She was also nominated for an Ericson Sony Award for "Ring the Alarm".

She worked with record producer Danja.

Track listing

Singles
 "Ring the Alarm"
 "Been Gone"
 "2U"
 "Fallen" featuring Freeway
 "Fallen" featuring Drake (remix)

References

2006 albums
Keshia Chanté albums
Albums produced by Danja (record producer)
Albums produced by Happy Perez